Félix-Gabriel-Marchand Bridge is a covered bridge in the Township of Mansfield-et-Pontefract, Quebec, Canada, that crosses the Coulonge River near Fort-Coulonge.

Constructed in 1898, this 148.66-metre-long bridge is the longest covered bridge in Quebec. This bridge is unique in Quebec because of its combination of Town and Queenpost trusses.

It is registered as an historic building by the Quebec government.

References

External links
 
 

Covered bridges in Canada
Transport in Outaouais
Heritage buildings of Quebec
Buildings and structures in Outaouais
Tourist attractions in Outaouais
Heritage sites in Outaouais